Tyulkinia is an extinct genus of camptoneuritid insects which existed in what is now Russia during the lower Permian period (Kungurian age). It was named by Danil S. Aristov, Sergey Yu. Storozhenko, Cui Yingying in 2010, and the type species is Tyulkinia bashkuevi. It takes its name from Tyulkino, Russia.

References 

Permian insects
Grylloblattodea
Paleozoic insects of Asia
Fossil taxa described in 2010
Fossils of Russia
Prehistoric insect genera